Jordana LeSesne, formerly known as 1.8.7, is an American musician and producer from Pittsburgh, Pennsylvania. She now produces and performs as Jordana. She became known in the mid-1990s as a drum and bass producer. Vibe magazine called her "one of the most respected Drum ‘n' Bass producers in the US." In 2015, she was named as one of "20 women who shaped the history of dance music" by Mixmag. She is transgender and came out in 1998.

She has released over 50 tracks, including four albums, several EPs, and remixes under the alias 1.8.7. The 1997 album When Worlds Collide became known for its "dark pummeling assaults". She has licensed tracks for compilations as well as the Sci Fi Channel. Three of her albums charted in the Top 25 of both the CMJ (College Music Journal) and Mixmag U.S. (later Mixer Magazine, now defunct) for 1997 as well as 1998 and 1999. Her third album "The Cities Collection" debuted in the CMJ Top 5 climbed to the #2 position on CMJ Music Monthly's dance chart for June 2000.

Her works have been reviewed by Billboard, Spin, Rolling Stone, Urb, Mixer, Mixmag, Raygun, as well as Knowledge – the U.K. Drum and Bass magazine. In 1999, she was listed in Raygun's Who's Who of International DJs. She was one of the headlining DJs on Knowledge Magazine's 28 city Kung Fu Knowledge tour in 1999.

Impact on music
Her work has influenced artists such as dubstep producer Bassnectar, who heavily sampled 5 A.M. Rinse (feat. MC Sphinx), the last song on her first album When Worlds Collide for his song Here We Go of his 2010 EP and single Timestretch. She has since unaligned herself with the aforementioned and is currently still awaiting some unpaid royalties promised to her by Bassnectar.  Additionally, electronic rock act Celldweller sampled "Wake Up" off of her first album as well as "San Francisco" off of her third album "The Cities Collection" in their 2013 song "Uncrowned".

In 1999, Drum & Bass/Hip Hop producer and label owner Hive approached Jordana to remix her song Defcon-1 also off of When Worlds Collide. Hive's remix appears on his 2001 album The Raw Uncut. Jordana collaborated with Lady Sovereign on a song early in Sov's career after the two met through an internet chat room for StrikeFM.co.uk, an online radio station which Jordana had a show, and the now defunct UKGarageWorldwide.com forums. The two would later team up when Jordana under her Lady J alias, had Lady Sovereign MC for her radio show on Flex FM London.

History
She first came to the attention of the music industry when she was asked to remix Blondie's "Atomic." Her remix appeared along with Armand Van Helden and Diddy’s remixes on the single. A little over a year following that release, Mac McFarlane, the promoter of the well established and legendary New York City club, Konkrete Jungle, contacted her to create a themed song for a CD compilation/mix-CD. Jordana created the song "Konkrete Jungle" for that purpose. Described by CMJ as containing "menacing hardstep attacks", it was released on the Ultra Records compilation, Konkrete Jungle - Maximum Drum & Bass, mixed by BBC Radio 1 Drum'n'Bass show host Jumpin Jack Frost. Following extensive touring throughout North America and abroad as a music producer, Liquid Sky Music, an indie label distributed by Caroline Distribution signed her to a three-album contract in late 1996.

Hate crime in Ohio
On the night of February 22, 2000 in Kent, Ohio, Jordana was attacked and beaten in a hate crime by a group of men including Matthew Gostlin. Gostlin and other assailants vaulted her in the parking lot outside of the Robin Hood nightclub where she had just performed on the Cities Collection tour. The group of men attacked suddenly and Jordana lost consciousness almost immediately after being struck in the face. She suffered nerve damage to the lower part of her face as a result. She was quoted, saying in the May 2000 issue of CMJ New Music Monthly that in the seconds just prior to the attack: "I saw his face. I remember the look on his face. It was this look of utter hate" In an interview with the Village Voice, George Meesig, a man from Cleveland, Ohio who defended her during the attack, stated that Gostlin had misgendered her, saying “this is personal”. Other reports noted by the Village Voice on the message board for Breakbeat Science (a Drum'n'Bass record store) mentioned transphobic slurs being shouted during the attack. She subsequently cancelled the tour. Gostlin, while charged, was never arrested nor spent any time in court. Her family was told by the Portage County (Ohio) prosecutor's office that attempts had been made to serve the warrant but Gostlin's whereabouts were unknown. She felt that justice would not be served so she left the United States for England.

Additional work in music industry
In addition to music production, Jordana is a DJ, musician and singer. From 2001 to 2002, she worked at Flex FM in London, England as Lady J, with Lady Sovereign performing for her during her radio show. In 2002, she held a club residency performing UK garage, 2-step garage and house music at the club Trinity in Vauxhall.

After returning to the United States, Jordana returned to rock and fronted a goth metal band in Seattle. Prior to that, she was asked to play bass in another band briefly where she became close friends with singer Shelita Burke. She has been billed alongside Arca for Planet Zolean: Un/Tuck + Hot Mass on the Currents.FM Common Multiverse Initiative. She was featured as Mix of the Day for Resident Advisor, and recently contributed to the Daisychain Podcast. After a long hiatus Jordana has returned to DJing out and made her first appearance in over a decade at the Seattle, Washington music festival, Kremfest at Kremwerk. She's since played multiple underground raves with upcoming shows on the horizon.

In 2014, Jordana scored the documentary Free CeCe, produced and directed by Jacqueline Gares and Laverne Cox. The documentary details the struggles of CeCe McDonald, an African-American trans woman wrongfully incarcerated for murder for defending herself against an attack on her outside a Minneapolis bar.

Literary mentions
She has been featured in several books. Her success in rising from living in a "rust belt" city to being an MTV-featured electronic music artist was mentioned in "The Rise of the Creative Class" by economist Richard Florida. She appears in two books detailing American electronic dance music scene history: Michaelangelo Matos's The Underground is Massive, and Rave Culture, an Insider's Overview by Jimi Fritz and Virginia Smallfry. Monica Roberts was a close confidante and cited Jordana's influence as pushing her to expand her printed publication TransGriot to a blog in 2006.

An interview with Jordana was featured in multiple books, including a book published in 2012 by rock journalist George Petros. She has spoken on her personal life in interviews for publications such as The Festival Voice, The Brooklyn Rail and href zine.

Personal life
She currently lives in Seattle, Washington.

Vinyl
 1995 Blondie "Atomic (The Beautiful Drum and Bass Mix)" VV58320 Chrysalis Records/EMI
 1996 RockStone Foundation "Dis Soun'" JS007 Jungle Sky
 1997 V/A – Nirvana EP "We Are Not Alone" JS114 Jungle Sky
 1997 Soul Slinger-Don't Believe "Abducted (1.8.7 Remix) JS118 Jungle Sky
 1997 Soul Slinger-Don't Believe "Ethiopia/JungleSky (1.8.7 Megamix)" JS118 Jungle Sky
 1997 1.8.7 – When Worlds Collide full-length album EP1 "Defcon 1"/"When Worlds Collide"/"Blueshift"/"Dragonfly" JSK121 Jungle Sky
 1997 1.8.7 – When Worlds Collide full-length album EP2 "Wake Up"/"Distant Storm Approaching"/"Ghetto Style"/"Ghetto Style (West Philly Mix)" JSK122 Jungle Sky
 1998 Murder 0ne (1.8.7)/T.Farmer "Annihilate"/"Memory" BOOST002 Boosted Records
 1998 This is Jungle Sky Vol. 5: Rock N Roll EP Disc 2 "Break In"/"The Return of Shaft"/"Konkrete Jungle" Jungle Sky JSK131
 1998 This is Jungle Sky Vol. 5: Rock N Roll EP Disc 3 "Atmosphere Remix"/"The Jam"/Beastie Boys – "Sabotage (1.8.7 JS Remix)" JSK132 Jungle Sky
 1998 1.8.7 – Quality Rolls full-length album EP1 "Quality Rolls"/"Relax Your Mind"/"Phobic" JSK136 Jungle Sky
 1998 1.8.7 – Quality Rolls full-length album EP2 *"Jerusalem"/"Get Amped" (215 Remix)/"Stigma" JSK 137 Jungle Sky
 1998 1.8.7 – Quality Rolls full-length album EP3 "Rock The Party"/"Deep Stealth"/"Cross the Line" JSK138 Jungle Sky
 1998 1.8.7 – Quality Rolls full-length album EP3 "United"/"Blue Nile"/"Reboot" JSK139 Jungle Sky
 1999 Jordana – "Pure Funk"/Stardust – "Music Sounds Better".. [With Bass] (Jordana JS remix) *whitelabel* JSK149 Jungle Sky
 1999 Jordana – Cities Collection 12" 1 "Hollywood (courtesy of Lucasfilm)"/"Los Angeles"/"New York" JSK157 Jungle Sky
 1999 Jordana – Cities Collection 12" 2 "Pittsburgh"/"Miami"/"San Francisco" JSK158 Jungle Sky
 2000 Loki and Jordana – "Murder" 12" *whitelabel*
 2001 Jordana – "Tampa Tantrum"/"In Your Arms" 12" TECO008 Technorganic
 2002 Lady J feat. Lady Sovereign – "The Intro Dub" (Flex FM)
 2002 Jordana – Full Colour 12" 1 *whitelabel* ConceptAudio
 2002 Jordana – Full Colour 12" 2 *whitelabel* ConceptAudio

CD releases
 1994 V/A – Interstellar Outback "Jungleman" ROM01 RomHyperMedia
 1995 V/A – Scotto Presents: Drop Beats Vol.1 "Ravestock Anthem" DROP001 Drop Entertainment
 1996 V/A – This Is Jungle Sky Vol.2 "Dis Soun" JSK008 Jungle Sky
 1997 V/A – This is Jungle Sky Vol.4 "We Are Not Alone" JSK116 Jungle Sky
 1997 V/A – Future Groove "We Are Not Alone" ?74321 50089 2 Ariola/BMG
 1997 V/A – New York Junglist "We Are Not Alone" AVCD11540 Avex Trax
 1997 Soul Slinger-Don't Believe CD "Abducted (187 Remix)" JSK120 Jungle Sky
 1997 Soul Slinger-Don't Believe CD "Ethiopia/JungleSky" JSK120 Jungle Sky
 1997 1.8.7 – When Worlds Collide CD album JSK124 Jungle Sky
 1998 V/A – This is Jungle Sky Vol.5 "The Jam" JSK130 Jungle Sky
 1998 V/A – This is Jungle Sky Vol.5 "Atmosphere Remix" JSK130 Jungle Sky
 1998 Soul Slinger – Upload: A Continuous Mix CD "Rock the Party" JSK142 Jungle Sky
 1998 V/A – Nu Balance: Domesticated Drum & Bass CD "5am Rinse" COA70016-2 City Of Angels
 1998 1.8.7 – Quality Rolls CD album JSK135 Jungle Sky
 1999 V/A – Sci Fidelity: This is Sci Fi. CD "Deep Stealth" SciFi Channel/Jungle Sky
 1999 V/A – This is Jungle Sky Vol.6 CD "Pure Funk" JSK150 Jungle Sky
 1999 V/A – This is Jungle Sky Vol.6 CD "Unite Remix" JSK150 Jungle Sky
 1999 Jordana presents 1.8.7 – The Cities Collection CD album JSK162 Jungle Sky
 1999 V/A – E-Sassin Absolute Friction CD "Worlds Apart" 21C.3007 Quantum Loop
 2000 V/A – Digital Empire: DJ Girl "Deep Stealth" 6454-2 Cold Front Records
 2001 Hive – The Raw Uncut EP CD "Defcon-1" (Hive Remix) VTXCD-002 Vortex Recordings
 2002 Jordana – Full Colour album ConceptAudio Limited Release
 2003 V/A – Girls In Space CD "In Your Arms" CD-9213 Urabon Records
 2005 Jordana – Jordana EP CD "In Your Arms" TECO CD001 Technorganic Recordings
 2005 Jordana – Jordana EP CD "Tampa Tantrum" TECO CD001 Technorganic Recordings
 2005 V/A – DJ Psycle-Back From The Future CD "In Your Arms" TECO CD-9213 Technorganic Recordings
 2005 V/A – DJ Psycle-Back From The Future CD "In Your Arms" TECO CD-9213 Technorganic Recordings
 2008 V/A – What the Bleep & Foi Oi Oi-Feelings For Detroit Vol.3 Yabette – "Babylon (1.8.7 Remix)" EEMIX003 Electronic Enlightenment

Digital releases
 2001 Jordana - Full Colour self released
 2003 Jordana - Numerology self released
 2020 Jordana - Resistencia EP self released
 2021 ill.Gates, Jordana and Mimi Page - The Arrival, "The Future" Alpha Pup Records/Producer Dojo

Videos
 We Are Not Alone (1998) – directed by MSKW1 aka Michael Whartnaby
 Defcon 1 (1998) – directed by MSKW1 aka Michael Whartnaby and DBIDWA aka Dan Bidwa
 Worlds Apart (1998) – directed by Gerard Ryan
 Atmosphere (1998) – directed by Gerard Ryan
 Ring Me Back (2002) – directed by Trevor McKinley
 The Future (2021) – animation by Adam Hatch

References

External links
 
 https://www.jordana.co
 https://jordanaofficial.bandcamp.com/
 https://www.mixcloud.com/jordana/
 https://soundcloud.com/jordanaofficial
 
 

Rock DJs
Remixers
American dance musicians
American electronic musicians
American techno musicians
American drum and bass musicians
LGBT people from Pennsylvania
Transgender women musicians
LGBT DJs
Musicians from Pittsburgh
Living people
Year of birth missing (living people)
American women in electronic music
Electronic dance music DJs
LGBT record producers
American women record producers
Transgender singers
African-American DJs
LGBT African Americans
20th-century African-American women singers
21st-century African-American women singers